Donald Scott Leitch  (born 6 October 1969) is a Scottish former football player and coach, who played as a midfielder. He played professionally for Dunfermline Athletic, Heart of Midlothian, Swindon Town and Motherwell, and managed Ross County.

Career
Leitch began his playing career in 1989 at junior club Shettleston before turning professional with Dunfermline Athletic in April 1990. After three years at Dunfermline he joined Heart of Midlothian, where he remained for another three years before moving to England with Swindon Town in a £15,000 transfer. Leitch returned to Scotland in 2000 with home-town team Motherwell where he played 128 league games, scoring 1 goal.

A succession of injury problems prompted Leitch to retire as player in 2006 and turn to management with Ross County, where he was officially appointed on 18 April 2006. He guided the club to their first national trophy in November 2006, when they won the Scottish Challenge Cup against Clyde, however the club were also relegated from the Scottish First Division the same season.

On 30 April 2007, Leitch resigned as manager of Ross County after the club's relegation. In June that year he became assistant manager to Mark McGhee at Motherwell. In June 2009 Leitch became the assistant manager of Aberdeen when McGhee became their manager. Leitch was sacked by Aberdeen on 1 December 2010 along with manager McGhee and coach Colin Meldrum after a poor run of results left them only spared from the foot of the Scottish Premier League by goal difference; they also oversaw the SPL's heaviest ever defeat when Celtic beat Aberdeen 9–0. Leitch was then academy director at Motherwell from November 2013 to December 2017.

Personal life
Leitch has two sons, Jack and Robbie, who have both played for Motherwell's youth teams. Jack left school in summer 2011 to sign a contract with Motherwell. After serious injury hampered his progress, he moved to Airdrieonians in 2016. Having been part of the team which won the 2015-16 Scottish Youth Cup, he also left the club in 2016, moving to Burnley.

Honors

Manager
Ross County
Scottish Challenge Cup: 2006–07

Notes

Leitch glad to be back at Well, stv interview 18 June 2007.

External links

1969 births
Living people
Footballers from Motherwell
Scottish footballers
Dunfermline Athletic F.C. players
Heart of Midlothian F.C. players
Swindon Town F.C. players
Motherwell F.C. players
Scottish football managers
Ross County F.C. managers
Scottish Premier League players
Aberdeen F.C. non-playing staff
Motherwell F.C. non-playing staff
Scottish Football League players
English Football League players
Scottish Football League managers
Association football midfielders
Glasgow United F.C. players
Scottish Junior Football Association players